Phantom 309 was an American noise rock band formed in Atlanta by Gary Held, John Forbes and Mac McNeilly. They existed for a brief amount of time and recorded one full-length album, titled A Sinister Alphabet, in 1989.

History 
Phantom 309 was founded in 1988 and issued their debut album, titled A Sinister Alphabet in 1989 on Tupelo Recording Company. It was produced by Jon Langford, known for his work with Mekons, Three Johns and The Waco Brothers, and featured artwork by renowned illustrator Edward Gorey, who allowed the band access to his work for $400. The group disbanded when Mac McNeilly moved to Chicago to play drums for The Jesus Lizard in 1989.

Discography 
A Sinister Alphabet (Tupelo, 1989)

References

External links 

Musical groups established in 1988
Musical groups disestablished in 1989
1988 establishments in Georgia (U.S. state)
1989 disestablishments in Georgia (U.S. state)
Rock music groups from Georgia (U.S. state)
Musical groups from Atlanta
American garage rock groups
American noise rock music groups
American punk rock groups
Punk blues musical groups